Pamulapati Ankineedu Prasada Rao is an Indian politician. He was a Member of Parliament, of the Lok Sabha, the lower house of India's Parliament, as a member of the Indian National Congress.

Early life 
Pamulapati Ankineedu Prasada Rao was born in Nidubrolu in Guntur District, Andhra Pradesh on February 23, 1929.  He graduated from A.C. college, Guntur.

Political career 
He was elected as a member of Legislative Assembly in 1967 from Ponnuru Assembly constituency.

He worked as a Minister of Commerce in Kasu Brahmananda Reddy cabinet in Andhra Pradesh during1969-71.

He was elected as a member of 5th Lok sabha (1971–77) from Ongole and 6th Lok sabha (1977–79) and 7th Lok sabha(1980-84) form Bapatla constituency.

He worked as Union Minister of State for Tourism and Civil Aviation in Charan Singh ministryduring  August–November, 1979.

References

External links
Official biographical sketch in Parliament of India website

Lok Sabha members from Andhra Pradesh
Indian National Congress politicians
India MPs 1971–1977
India MPs 1977–1979
India MPs 1980–1984
1929 births
1997 deaths
Indian National Congress politicians from Andhra Pradesh